Ellarum Chollanu is a 1992 Indian Malayalam-language comedy-drama film directed by Kaladharan and written by Rafi Mecartin, starring Mukesh and Jagathy Sreekumar in the lead roles. This movie has One of the most successful  
.

Plot
The story is about Ramachandran, who comes back from Dubai to the village posing as a rich business man with a fortune. Actually, he was a victim of visa fraud and was acting as assistant to lottery ticket seller Adimakkannu. Rumours of his fortune were actually spread by his friends. But Ramachandran plays along and tries to take over the major factory in the village, Archana Mills.

Cast

 Mukesh as Ramachandran Menon	
 Suman Ranganathan as Archana
 Maniyanpilla Raju	 as Mani
 Mamukkoya	 as Adimakkannu
 Sai Kumar as Dasutty
 Jagathy Sreekumar as Pillai
 Paravoor Bharathan as Mathunni	
 Oduvil Unnikrishnan as Ravunni Menon
 Vijayaraghavan as Gopalakrishnan/ G. K.
 A. C. Zainuddin as  Shaik Ahammed khaltha
 Sukumari  as Ramachandran Menon's mother
 Beena Antony
 Kollam Thulasi
 Abi
 Kalabhavan Rahman
 Kalabhavan Haneef
Usharani

Soundtrack 

Songs were composed by S. P. Venkatesh, with lyrics penned by Sreekumaran Thampi.

References

External links

1992 films
1990s Malayalam-language films
Films directed by Kaladharan